Barry Ackroyd, BSC (born 12 May 1954) is an English cinematographer and director. Ackroyd has frequently worked with directors Ken Loach and Paul Greengrass. He worked on Kathryn Bigelow's 2008 war film The Hurt Locker as well as the critically acclaimed 2013 biographical thriller Captain Phillips, the former earning him a BAFTA Award and an Academy Award nomination for Best Cinematography. In 2014, Ackroyd became the president of the British Society of Cinematographers.

Life and career
Ackroyd was born in Oldham, England. He received a BAFTA nomination for Best Cinematography for The Lost Prince. His latest credits are on Ken Loach's award-winning feature, The Wind That Shakes The Barley, Paul Greengrass's take on the 9-11 disaster, United 93, and the Kathryn Bigelow-directed Iraq War film, The Hurt Locker.

Teamwork and group effort is the Loach modus operandi. Loach has denied his status as an auteur director. Unlike most directors who routinely overstate the importance of their personal achievements, Loach celebrates the contributions of his crew, such as frequent collaborator, cinematographer Barry Ackroyd.

Film reviewer Jack Matthews of the New York Daily News remarked about the filmmaking behind The Wind That Shakes The Barley: "Beautifully shot, both in darkened homes and on the misty green Irish landscape by Loach's frequent cinematographer Barry Ackroyd, "Wind" has a you-are-there intensity and intimacy about it that make it nearly overwhelming."

In 2016, he reunited with Greengrass for the fourth time for the fifth Bourne movie.

Filmography

References

External links
National Film and Television School "Barry Ackroyd BSC"

  "Ken Loach" by Mike Robbins
New York Daily News, Jack Matthews "The Wind That Shakes the Barley" review quote
May 21, 2008 Picks & Pans - Movies "Battle in Seattle" - Seattle Weekly
United 93

1954 births
Living people
Best Cinematography BAFTA Award winners
English cinematographers
European Film Award for Best Cinematographer winners
People from Oldham